

List of constituencies

South West England (148)

Cornwall (42)

Devon (26)

Somerset (16)

Dorset (20)

Gloucestershire (10)

Wiltshire (34)

South East England (126)

Buckinghamshire (14)

Oxfordshire (9)

Berkshire (9)

Hampshire (26)

Surrey (14)

Sussex (28)

Kent (18)

Middlesex (8)

East Anglia (56)

Bedfordshire (4)

Hertfordshire (6)

Huntingdonshire (4)

Cambridgeshire (6)

Norfolk (12)

Suffolk (16)

Essex (8)

West Midlands (45)

Herefordshire (8)

Worcestershire (9)

Warwickshire (6)

Shropshire (12)

Staffordshire (10)

East Midlands (39)

Derbyshire (4)

Nottinghamshire (8)

Lincolnshire (12)

Leicestershire (4)

Rutland (2)

Northamptonshire (9)

North West England (28)

Cheshire (4)

Lancashire (14)

Cumberland (6)

Westmorland (4)

Yorkshire and the North East (42)

Yorkshire (30)

Northumberland (8)

Durham (4)

Wales (27)

Anglesey (2)

Caernarvonshire (2)

Denbighshire (2)

Flintshire (2)

Merionethshire (1)

Montgomeryshire (2)

Cardiganshire (2)

Pembrokeshire (3)

Carmarthenshire (2)

Radnorshire (2)

Breconshire (2)

Glamorganshire (2)

Monmouthshire (3)

Scotland (53)

Orkney and Shetland (1)

Caithness (2)

Sutherland (1)

Ross and Cromarty (1)

Invernessshire (2)

Banffshire (1)

Elginshire and Nairnshire (2)

Aberdeenshire (2)

Kincardineshire (1)

Forfarshire (3)

Perthshire (2)

Clackmannanshire and Kinrossshire (1)

Fife (3)

Argyllshire (1)

Dunbartonshire (1)

Renfrewshire (3)

Stirlingshire (3)

Ayrshire (3)

Buteshire (1)

Lanarkshire (3)

Linlithgowshire (1)

Midlothian (4)

Haddingtonshire (2)

Dumfriesshire (2)

Wigtownshire (2)

Kirkcudbright Stewartry (1)

Selkirkshire (1)

Peeblesshire (1)

Roxburghshire (1)

Berwickshire (1)

Ulster (29)

Antrim (6)

Londonderry (4)

Tyrone (3)

Armagh (4)

Down (3)

Fermanagh (3)

Donegal (2)

Monaghan (2)

Cavan (2)

Connacht (14)

Galway (4)

Leitrim (2)

Roscommon (3)

Sligo (3)

Mayo (2)

Leinster (35)

Longford (2)

Louth (4)

King's County (2)

Queen's County (3)

Meath (2)

Westmeath (2)

Carlow (3)

Dublin (6)

Wicklow (2)

Kildare (2)

Kilkenny (3)

Wexford (4)

Munster (29)

Clare (3)

Tipperary (4)

Limerick (4)

Kerry (3)

Cork (8)

Waterford (5)

See also 

1801